The following lists events in the year 2019 in Israel.

Incumbents
 President – Reuven Rivlin
 Prime Minister – Benjamin Netanyahu
 President of the Supreme Court – Esther Hayut
 Chief of General Staff – Aviv Kochavi
 Government of Israel – 34th government of Israel

Events

January 
 January 24 – 2019 Judo Grand Prix Tel Aviv began

March 
 March 25 – U.S. President Donald Trump signs Proclamation on Recognizing the Golan Heights as Part of the State of Israel.

April 
 April 9 – April 2019 Israeli legislative election
 April 11 – Israeli spacecraft Beresheet crashes on the moon.

May 
 3–6 May – Gaza–Israel clashes (May 2019)
 14–18 May – The Eurovision Song Contest 2019 is held at the Expo Tel Aviv in Israel. 
18 May  – Kobi Marimi represents Israel at the Eurovision Song Contest with the song “ Home”.

July 
 2–3 July – Ethiopian Jews protest in Israel

September 
 September 17 – September 2019 Israeli legislative election

November 
 12–14 November – Gaza–Israel clashes (November 2019)

December

 12 December — Israel will need to hold its third general election in less than a year. this is totally unprecedented in Israel's history. this is because of the apparent inability of any of the major parties to be able to form a governing coalition that would be decisive under the laws of Israel's parliamentary system.
 20 December — International Criminal Court investigation in Palestine announced by ICC chief prosecutor Fatou Bensouda to investigate alleged breaches by both sides in the Israeli–Palestinian conflict
 31 December – Israel started extraction from the Leviathan gas field.

Deaths

 7 January – Moshe Arens (b. 1925), aeronautical engineer, diplomat and politician.
 25 January – Meshulam Riklis (b.1923), Turkish-born Israeli businessman.
 1 February – Yosef Sorinov (b. 1946), footballer.
 6 February – Yechiel Eckstein (b. 1951), Israeli-American rabbi.
 14 February – Michael Nudelman(b. 1938), politician.
 17 February – Ami Maayani (b. 1936), composer.
 26 February –  (b. 1935), composer.
 11 March – Yona Atari (b. 1933), singer and actress.
 11 March – Danny Ben-Israel (b. 1944), musician.
 23 March – Rafi Eitan (b. 1926), spy and politician.
 2 May – Micha Lindenstrauss (b. 1937), judge and State Comptroller.
 4 June – Nechama Rivlin (b. 1945), First Lady of Israel.
 7 July – Ora Namir  (b. 1930), politician and diplomat.
 18 October Meir Shamgar (b. 1925), jurist and former Chief Justice of the Supreme Court.
 8 December – Herbert Pundik (b. 1927), Danish-Israeli journalist and author.
 18 December – Geulah Cohen (b. 1925), politician and activist.

See also

 2019–20 Israeli constitutional crisis
 2019–20 Israeli political crisis

References

 
2010s in Israel
Years of the 21st century in Israel
Israel
Israel